Sotke mut (English: Mess me up) is the debut studio album by Finnish singer-songwriter Sanni. The album peaked at number-nine on the Finnish albums charts, and includes the top ten singles "Prinsessoja ja astronautteja" and "Me ei olla enää me". It has since been certified platinum by Musiikkituottajat after selling over 20,000 copies.

Singles
The album's lead single, "Prinsessoja ja astronautteja" was released on 4 April 2013. The song peaked at number-three on the Finnish singles chart, while it also peaked at numbers 12 and 24, on the downloads and airplay charts, respectively. Its next single was "Jos mä oon oikee" which was released on 18 June 2013. The song did not peak on the singles chart, despite reaching number nineteen on both the airplay and downloads charts.  The album's third single, "Me ei olla enää me" was released on 20 September 2013. It went on to peak at number-three on the Finnish singles chart, while it also reached numbers 4 and 13 on the airplay and downloads charts, respectively. "Dementia" and "Hakuna matata" were released as the fourth and fifth singles, respectively, in 2014.

Track listing

Charts and certifications

Charts

Certifications

Release history

References

2013 albums
Sanni (singer) albums
Finnish-language albums
Warner Music Group albums